Party Never Ends is the third studio album recorded by Romanian singer Inna in 2013.

Party Never Ends may also refer to:
"The Party Never Ends", a song by Kasabian from their 2017 album For Crying Out Loud

See also
The Party Never Stops: Diary of a Binge Drinker, a 2007 television film